Tropical Storm Danielle was a strong tropical storm that made landfall on Virginia in the 1992 Atlantic hurricane season. The fourth storm of the season, Danielle was one of two tropical cyclones in the year to make landfall in the United States, the other being Hurricane Andrew. It formed out of a stationary trough of low pressure on September 18 near the coast of North Carolina. The system quickly reached tropical storm status, and Danielle looped to the west due to a change in steering currents. Tropical Storm Danielle reached a peak of  winds before weakening and hitting the Delmarva Peninsula. The storm quickly dissipated over land.

The storm dropped light rainfall throughout its path, and winds were minimal. The combination of Danielle and a high pressure system produced higher than normal tides and strong waves, causing beach erosion and light coastal damage. The waves killed two in New Jersey from a boat sinking, and also destroyed three houses in the Outer Banks of North Carolina. Overall damage from the storm was minimal.

Meteorological history 

A surface trough of low pressure with an area of convection persisted off the southeast coast of the United States on September 18. On the same day, a weak tropical wave which moved off the coast of Africa on September 8 approached the area. Organization continued as outflow became better defined, and the system developed into Tropical Depression Six later that day.

The depression rapidly organized and attained tropical storm status with winds of  just six hours after forming, upon which it was named Danielle. In response to an approaching trough, Danielle initially moved to the northeast. However, the trough outran the system, and a developing high pressure system to its north resulted in Danielle executing a tight, anticyclonic loop on September 23 to the 24th. The storm strengthened as it turned to the northwest, and reached a peak of  winds on September 25 while just off the northeastern coast of North Carolina. Danielle turned to the north-northwest, and made landfall on the Eastern Shore of Virginia late on the 25th. It rapidly weakened over land, and dissipated over eastern Pennsylvania on September 26.

Preparations 

Early in its life, forecasters had difficulties regarding the future track and intensity of Danielle, including a northeastward motion instead of its loop. After Danielle executed its loop, forecasters consistently predicted a landfall along the northeastern North Carolina coastline. As a result, officials issued Tropical Storm Warnings for the coast of North Carolina on September 24, 36 hours before the storm passed to the east of the state. The continued northward motion caught forecasters off guard, and consequentially tropical storm warnings were not issued for the Delmarva Peninsula until just 12 hours before the storm made landfall. In addition, forecasters issued tropical storm warnings from Delaware through Watch Hill, Rhode Island, as a precaution.

In North Carolina, ferry operations between Ocracoke and the mainland at Hyde County were closed, while officials canceled schools in Dare County, North Carolina due to the approaching storm. Several families voluntarily evacuated St. George's Island in southern St. Mary's County, Maryland. In addition, officials in Delaware recommended evacuations for low-level areas and beaches. As a precaution, officials set up two shelters in Kent County.

Impact

North Carolina 
Several other locations reported over tropical storm force winds.

Waves and high tides from the storm caused flooding along the Pamlico Sound side of Ocracoke and southern Hatteras Island. High tides from the storm also destroyed two houses in South Nags Head and one in Rodanthe, two of which were previously condemned after the 1991 Perfect Storm. Three other houses in the Outer Banks were threatened by the storm. Elsewhere in the Outer Banks, damage was minimal, and was limited to pedestrian ramps and steps to the beachfront.

Mid-Atlantic 

The waves caused significant overwash, leaving parts of Norfolk under  of water. Several homes, businesses, and cars were flooded, as well. The waves also eroded beaches along the coast. Overall, damage was minimal, and there were no reports of deaths or injuries.

Waves from the storm caused minor to moderate beach erosion along the coastline, and the combination of waves and high tides caused moderate street flooding. Near Salisbury, the storm produced a possible hook echo, though no tornadoes were reported. Danielle caused no deaths or injuries in the state.

Danielle caused 2 to 3-foot (.6 to .9-m) higher than normal tides, along with strong waves. The combination of the two flooded some coastal houses and resulted in significant beach and dune erosion. The waves also sank four boats and washed away a dock near Slaughter Beach. Gusty winds caused power outages in New Castle County, while persistent rainfall caused sewer interruptions. Overall, with the exception of the severe beach erosion, damage was minimal.

Northeast United States 
Strong waves from the storm washed out miles of beaches along the coastline. In Ocean City, the waves passed over the boardwalk and into houses. Further north, the waves crashed a four-person, 35-foot (10-m) sailboat near Island Beach State Park. Two managed to swim safely to shore, though the other two occupants drowned.

Damage in New England is unknown.

See also 

 Other storms of the same name
 List of North Carolina hurricanes
 List of New Jersey hurricanes
 Timeline of the 1992 Atlantic hurricane season
 Tropical Storm Fay (2020)

References 

1992 Atlantic hurricane season
Hurricanes in Maryland
Atlantic tropical storms
1992 natural disasters in the United States
Hurricanes in North Carolina
Hurricanes in New Jersey
Hurricanes in Virginia